Petras Karla (9 April 1937 – 14 October 1969) was a Lithuanian rower who specialized in the eight event. In this event he won three silver medals at the European and world championships of 1962–1964 and finished fifth at the 1964 Summer Olympics.

In 1962, Karla graduated from the Physics Department of Vilnius University.

References

External links
 

1937 births
1969 deaths
Lithuanian male rowers
Olympic rowers of the Soviet Union
Rowers at the 1964 Summer Olympics
Soviet male rowers
World Rowing Championships medalists for the Soviet Union
European Rowing Championships medalists